"Yo, Yo, Yo" is a song by American recording artist, Dani Stevenson. The song was featured in the soundtrack to the 2002 film, XXX and served as the second single for Stevenson's unreleased debut album, Is There Another?!.

Track listings and formats
12" vinyl
 "Yo, Yo, Yo" (Main)
 "Yo, Yo, Yo" (Radio)
 "Yo, Yo, Yo" (Instrumental)
 "Yo, Yo, Yo" (Accapella)

CD single
 "Album Version" – 3:32
 "Instrumental" – 3:52

Chart performance

References

2002 songs
2003 singles
Neo soul songs